Edwin G. Waite (died 30 October 1894) was an American politician, newspaper man, author, and goldminer.  He was a member of  California's 16th State Assembly district, Alameda, California from 1855 until 1856.  In 1891, he became Secretary of State of California, and died in office in 1894. He belonged to the Whig, Know Nothing, Union, and Republican parties during his political career.

While living in Nevada County, California, Waite was a newspaperman associated with the Nevada Daily Transcript of Nevada City, California. He also was coauthor of The Discovery of Gold in California, which included, in the section titled 'Pioneer Mining', a reprint of Waite's recollections about his experiences in the 1849–1851 gold diggings period.

He married Julia Eliza Stone (born March 17, 1839) on May 13, 1856.

Waite is interred in the Sacramento Historic City Cemetery in Sacramento, California.

Partial bibliography

References

1894 deaths
Members of the California State Assembly
Secretaries of State of California
19th-century American newspaper people
People from Alameda County, California
People from Nevada County, California
California Whigs
19th-century American politicians
California Republicans
California Know Nothings
Year of birth missing
Journalists from California